Scouse the Mouse is a children's album released in the UK in 1977. It featured the vocals of Ringo Starr and others.

Story and recording
Starr appears as the album's main character, Scouse the Mouse, who emigrates from Liverpool to the United States.  Scouse is a word for things from Liverpool.  Other characters are played by Adam Faith (“Bonce the Mouse”) and Barbara Dickson (“Molly Jolly”).  The album was written, directed and narrated by Donald Pleasence.  Most of the songs performed on the album were composed by Roger Brown.

Starr's tracks ("I Know a Place", "S.O.S.", "A Mouse Like Me", "Living in a Pet Shop", "Scouse's Dream", "Running Free", "Boat Ride" and "Scouse the Mouse") were recorded in July 1977, produced by Hugh Murphy, at Berwick Street Studios.

Release
An animated television version of the story was planned for airing on ITV, but it was delayed due to a strike and ultimately shelved.

Scouse the Mouse was released on 9 December 1977 in the UK by Polydor. The album, which was the third and final release in Starr's three-album deal with Polydor Records, was not issued in the United States.

Track listing
All tracks are written by Roger Brown, except where noted.

References
 Footnotes

 Citations

1977 albums
Ringo Starr albums
Polydor Records albums
Children's music albums by British artists